"The Wall" is the fifty-eighth episode and the twenty-third episode of the third season (1988–89) of the television series The Twilight Zone. In this episode, an army major is sent to investigate a portal to another world.

Plot
Major Alex McAndrews is escorted to a research laboratory where he meets with General Greg Slater. Slater explains that two months prior, researchers accidentally blasted a hole through a wall, from which a bright light emerges. Scientists believe it is a gate. Due to the accidental nature of its creation, they cannot replicate it. Slater warns McAndrews that four volunteers have already entered and never returned. McAndrews agrees to investigate.

McAndrews enters the hole and arrives in what looks like a meadow. There is atmosphere to support life, but no sign of the "gate", and radio communication with headquarters is disabled. He meets one of the earlier volunteers, Kincaid, who is accompanied by a woman named Baret. The other volunteers arrive. They have determined from the stars that they are not on Earth, and there is no way to return from this side. The indigenous people welcome them to their peaceful idyllic community. McAndrews thoroughly explores to assure himself that there is no point of return, but gradually finds he is happier remaining in this world.

McAndrews discovers that the volunteers lied about the gate. It is still there but can only be seen at night. Kincaid claims that if they went back the government would send in more people, ruining the paradise they have found. McAndrews considers this insufficient grounds for betraying their honor. Kincaid proposes to keep McAndrews there by force, so he strikes Kincaid and escapes through the gate. McAndrews reports everything to his superiors. Immediately afterwards McAndrews changes his mind. He discards his military badge, destroys the computer which created the gate, and runs through the gate. Back in the community, McAndrews tells Baret that without the computer, the gate can never be recreated.

External links
 

1989 American television episodes
The Twilight Zone (1985 TV series season 3) episodes

fr:Le Passage (La Cinquième Dimension)